Jin Xianzhai (March 7, 1904 – September 4, 1990) is a Chinese oncologist, who created the first cancer ward, the first oncology journal Chinese Journal of Clinical Oncology and China's first oncologist organization, the Anti-Cancer Society of China. He educated many Chinese oncologists in the early years after the founding of the People's Republic of China, and is known as the "Father of Chinese Oncology".

Biography

Early years
Jin was born in Seoul, Korea (today South Korea) in 1904. In 1919, when Korea was under Japanese occupation, he participated the nation-wide anti-Japanese March 1st Movement. To avoid possible arrest by the Japanese police, his father sent him to China where his older brother operated a clinic. Funded by his older brother, he continued his education at an American Baptist school in Shanghai, and later studied Pre-medical at University of Shanghai. In 1926, he was admitted to Peking Union Medical College, which was founded by Rockefeller Foundation in Beijing in 1921. He obtained his Chinese citizenship in 1930 during his higher education, and obtained his American Doctor of Medicine degree in 1931.

He became a physician of Peking Union Medical College Hospital after graduation. In 1933, American doctors there created the first cancer ward in China. Jin became a lead oncologist of the ward next year, making him the first Chinese person to study and practice oncology. In 1937, he was sent to Memorial Sloan Kettering Cancer Center in New York to study pathology from James Ewing. One year later, he went to Chicago to study Clinical oncology, focusing on Radiation oncology and Surgical oncology. In 1939, when he came back to Beijing, he was promoted to the director of the cancer ward and appointed as associate professor.

In 1941, after the Attack on Pearl Harbor, the Japanese occupied the American operated Peking Union Medical College Hospital in Beijing. Jin and his Chinese colleagues were forced to move to Tianjin. In 1945, after the end of World War II, he went to study in Chicago for another more than one year.

After 1949

In 1951, the government of People's Republic of China took over the hospital established by John Kenneth MacKenzie in Tianjin. One year later, Jin established the first cancer ward there, and later turned the hospital into one that specialized in cancer treatments. In 1866, the hospital was named the current name "Tianjin Medical University Cancer Institute and Hospital".

From 1954, at the request of the China Ministry of Health, he began to offer oncology training programs annually to nationally selected physicians. Many of his students later turned into leading oncologists throughout the country.

Jin died of sepsis on September 4, 1990, in Tianjin. He was named as the "Father of Chinese Oncology" for his contributions to the oncology study in China. In 1994, a bronze statue of him was erected at Tianjin Medical University Cancer Institute and Hospital.

References

Korean emigrants to China
Chinese oncologists
Peking Union Medical College alumni
1904 births
1990 deaths